Combs is a surname. Notable people with the surname include:

Sports:
 Beth Combs (born 1969), American basketball coach
 Earle Combs (1899–1976), American center fielder and Baseball Hall of Fame member
 Frederick Combs (1935–1992), American actor
 Glen Combs (born 1946), American basketball player
Jeremy Combs (born 1995), American basketball player for Israeli team Hapoel Ramat Gan Givatayim
 Merl Combs (1919–1981), a shortstop in Major League Baseball from 1947–1952
 Pat Combs (born 1966), a Philadelphia Phillies pitcher from 1989–1992

Television:
 Jeffrey Combs (born 1954), American character actor
 Ray Combs (1956–1996), American television game show host and stand-up comedian
 Holly Marie Combs (born 1973), American actress

Other:
 Allan Combs (born 1942), consciousness researcher and neuropsychologist
 Jessi Combs (1983–2019), American race driver and actress
 John Combs, Manitoba judge
 Lewis Combs (1895–1996), United States Admiral
 Rodney Combs (born 1950), American NASCAR driver
 Sean Combs (born 1969), American record producer, CEO, clothing designer, actor, and rapper known as Diddy

See also
 Coombs (disambiguation)
 Coombe (disambiguation)